/\ may refer to:

 Λ, uppercase lambda, the 11th letter of the Greek alphabet
 /\, ASCII symbol for boolean "and" operator, formed with a slash and a backslash
 /\, an ALGOL 68 boolean "and" operator
 /\, the boolean "and" operator in early K&R C in Unix V6, Unix V7 and more recently BSD 2.11
 ∧, the wedge symbol, used for logical conjunction
 ^, the caret symbol

See also 
 Chevron (insignia), a V-shaped mark, often inverted